Biswanath Singh Institute of Legal Studies is a private Law school situated beside Lal Darwaza Main Road, Basudevpur in Munger in the Indian state of Bihar. It offers undergraduate 3 years LL.B. and 5 years Integrated Law course which is approved by Bar Council of India (BCI), New Delhi and affiliated to Munger University. Biswanath Singh Institute of Legal Studies was established in 1992.

References

Law schools in Bihar
Universities and colleges in Bihar
Colleges affiliated to Tilka Manjhi Bhagalpur University
Educational institutions established in 1992
1992 establishments in Bihar
Education in Munger district